Padornelo may refer to the following places:

Portugal
 Padornelo (Portugal)

Spain
 Padornelo (Castile and León), in the municipality of Lubián
 Padornelo (Galicia), in the municipality of Pedrafita do Cebreiro